Çangallı is a village in the Elbeyli District, Kilis Province, Turkey. The village is inhabited by Turkmens of the Elbegli tribe and Abdals of the Kurular tribe and had a population of 88 in 2022.

References

Villages in Elbeyli District